Ellis Bermingham (1708-1789) was born in 1708 as Ellis (Elizabeth) Agar, daughter of James Agar MP of Gowran  Castle, County  Kilkenny and his second wife Mary Wemyss. She married, first (1726), Theobald Bourke, 7th Viscount Mayo, and after his death in 1742 married secondly (1745) Francis Bermingham, 14th Baron Athenry (1692–1750). She had no issue by either marriage.

In 1758 Ellis Bermingham was granted (for life only) the title "Countess of Brandon, in the County of Kilkenny", a title in the Peerage of Ireland. The title became extinct on her death on 11 March 1789.

The Right Reverend Charles Agar, 1st Earl of Normanton, Archbishop of Dublin, was Lady Brandon's nephew.

Countesses of Brandon (1758)
Ellis Bermingham, Countess of Brandon (1708–1789)

See also
Viscount Mayo
Baron Athenry
Earl of Normanton

References

Earls in the Peerage of Ireland
1708 births
1789 deaths
Irish countesses
Mayo
Athenry
Life peeresses created by George II